Martian Chess is an abstract strategy game for two or four players invented by Andrew Looney in 1999. It is played with Icehouse pyramids on a chessboard. To play with a number of players other than two or four, a non-Euclidean surface can be tiled to produce a board of the required size, allowing up to six players.

In his review in Abstract Games Magazine, Kerry Handscomb stated: "The first thing to note about Martian Chess is that it is not a chess-type game at all. Instead, the objective is to accumulate points by capturing pieces." "Martian Chess is [...] an original game with novel tactics and strategy." Looney in 1996 had invented Monochrome Chess, a similar two player game that uses regular chess pieces where the half of the board determined who controlled a piece. While the king is not royal, that piece and rook can castle.

History 
Martian Chess was one of four games in the Icehouse: The Martian Chess Set released by Looney Labs in 1999. The set was Looney Labs's first Icehouse release and first to showcase its potential as a game system. The other three games were IceTowers, IceTraders and  Zarcana. In 2001, Icehouse: The Martian Chess Set won the Origins Award for Best Abstract Board Game of 2000. The rules to the game were reissued in 3HOUSE booklet in 2007, again by 2013 in Pyramid Primer #1 and in 2016 as a part of Pyramid Arcade boxed set.

Rules

Initial setup 
Each player starts with nine pieces: three small (pawns), three medium (drones), and three large (queens). The color of the pieces is irrelevant to the gameplay. A mix of colors is recommended.

Players initially place their pieces in the corners of the board as shown. In a two-player game, only a half-board is used. The players decide who moves first. Play turns alternate, and pass to the left after each move.

Movement and capturing 
The red lines in the diagrams indicate notional canals which divide the board into territories, or quadrant. At any given time a player controls only those pieces that are in his or her territory.

The pieces move as follows:
 Pawns move one space diagonally in any direction. (Unlike chess pawns, they may move backwards.)
 Drones move one or two spaces horizontally or vertically, without jumping. (Like chess rooks, but with limited range.) 
 Queens move any distance horizontally, vertically, or diagonally, without jumping. (The same as chess queens.)

As in chess, a square may contain no more than one piece, and a piece is captured when an enemy piece lands on the square it occupies. The capturing player removes the piece and puts it aside for later scoring.

In the two-player game, a player may not immediately reverse an opponent's last move (i.e. may not move the piece across the canal back to its departure square, on the next turn).

End of game and scoring 
The game ends when one player runs out of pieces (i.e., their territory becomes empty). Players then compute their scores by adding up the point values of the pieces they captured: queen = 3, drone = 2, pawn = 1. The player or team with the highest total wins the game.

In the four-player game, the players form two teams, with teammates in opposite corners. Teammates play for a combined score. Aside from strategic differences, play is unaffected; it is legal (and sometimes good strategy) to capture your teammate's pieces.

Strategy 
Capturing with a queen often allows the opponent to immediately recapture, leading to a back-and-forth battle until one player runs out of pieces in the line(s) of capture. This is more common in two-player games, since other players may interfere in the four-player version. The net point difference is usually minor with two players, but can give the players involved a significant lead over the others in a four-player game.

Moving a pawn or drone into enemy territory can be a good move for several reasons:
 it can prevent an opponent from capturing the piece from you
 it can ensure the availability of a piece to capture from an opponent
 it can block an attack from an enemy queen or drone

See also 
 Icehouse pieces
 Looney Labs

References

External links 
  by Andrew Looney

Icehouse games
Abstract strategy games
Board games introduced in 1995